The Neptunes Present... Clones is a compilation album produced and released by American production duo The Neptunes (producer-singer Pharrell Williams and producer Chad Hugo). It was released on August 19, 2003 and has been certified Gold by the RIAA. The album featured six singles; "Frontin'" by Pharrell Williams, "Popular Thug" by Kelis, "Light Your Ass on Fire" by Busta Rhymes, “Rock ‘n’ Roll” by Fam-Lay, "Hot Damn" by Clipse and "It Blows My Mind" by Snoop Dogg.

Critical reception 

Clones received generally positive reviews from music critics.

Commercial performance 
The album debuted at number one on the US Billboard 200 chart, with first-week sales of 250,000 copies in the United States. In its second week, the album fell to number three on the Billboard 200, selling 115,000 copies. In its third week, Clones fell to number six on the US chart with 81,000 copies, for a three-week total of 450,000 units. The album sold over 500,000 domestically, and has been certified Gold by the RIAA.

Track listing
All songs produced by The Neptunes.

Credits
Executive producers – Pharrell Williams, and Chad Hugo for Star Trak Entertainment
All tracks produced by The Neptunes
Pharrell Williams – keyboards, synthesizers, programming, mixing
Chad Hugo – keyboards, synthesizers, sequencer, mixing

Charts

Weekly charts

Year-end charts

Certifications

See also
 List of UK R&B Albums Chart number ones of 2003
 List of Billboard 200 number-one albums of 2003
 List of Billboard number-one R&B/Hip-Hop albums of 2003

References

2003 compilation albums
The Neptunes albums
Star Trak Entertainment compilation albums
Hip hop compilation albums
Albums produced by the Neptunes